Billy's Dad is a Fudge-Packer! is a 2004 American black-and-white short comedy film written and directed by Jamie Donahue in her first non-acting effort. It is a parody of the 1950s social guidance films, and depicts the life of a boy learning about adulthood in a traditional family. The apparently innocent account of family life in the 1950s is loaded with sexual innuendo. It was made by production company POWER UP.

Plot
Billy is a boy who has to decide what he will do with his life. His father works at the candy factory as a "fudge packer" (which is modern slang for a man who performs homosexual anal sex) and "has several men under him". His mother is visited by a short, mannish woman who knows how to please the local housewives. His sister is preparing to be a good wife, and in almost every shot is moving a phallic object to her mouth.

Cast
 Spencer Daniels as Billy
 Robert Gant as Billy's dad
 Cady Huffman as Billy's mom
 Alex Borstein as Betty Henderson
 Gina Rodgers as Billy's sister
 D. C. Douglas as 50's announcer

Film festivals
Film festivals in which Billy's Dad Is a Fudge-Packer! appeared include:

2005
 Sundance Film Festival
 Tribeca Film Festival
 PlanetOut Film Festival COMEDY FINALIST
 Austin Gay & Lesbian International Film Festival
 Boston Gay & Lesbian Film Festival
 Brisbane Queer Film Festival
 Cineffable – Paris Lesbian Film Festival
 Cinequest
 Closet Cinema - Southwest Gay and Lesbian Film Festival
 Comedia - Just for Laughs
 Connecticut Gay & Lesbian Film Festival
 Fairy Tales International Gay & Lesbian Film Festival
 FilmOut San Diego Film Festival
 Frameline
 Fresno Reel Pride Film Festival
 Image + Nation – Montreal Gay & Lesbian Film Festival
 Inside Out - Toronto Lesbian & Gay Film and Video Festival
 London Lesbian Film Festival
 Martha's Vineyard Independent Film Festival
 Melbourne Queer Film Festival
 Miami Gay & Lesbian Film Festival
 Nashville Film Festival
 Newport Beach Film Festival
 North Carolina Gay & Lesbian Film Festival
 OUT Loud Long Beach Art & Film Festival
 Oslo Gay & Lesbian Film Festival
 Outfest
 Palm Springs International Festival of Short Films
 Philadelphia Gay & Lesbian Film Festival
 PlanetOut Film festival
 Q Cinema-Fort Worth Gay & Lesbian Film Festival
 Queer Screen-Mardi Gras Film Festival, Darlinghurst, Australia
 Queersicht – Bern, Switzerland Gay & Lesbian Film Festival
 Reel Affirmations – Washington DC GLBT Film Festival
 Reel Queer Syracuse
 Rhode Island International Film Festival
 Sacramento International Gay & Lesbian Film Festival
 Seattle Lesbian and Gay Film festival

Reception
Apocalypse Later Film Reviews said, It's hard for a film to live up to a title like this, but Billy's Dad is a Fudge-Packer! manages it with aplomb."

References

External links
 

2000s parody films
2004 LGBT-related films
2004 short films
2004 films
American LGBT-related short films
American black-and-white films
LGBT-related comedy films
American comedy short films
American mockumentary films
2004 comedy films
2000s English-language films
2000s American films